is a 1979 fixed shooter arcade game developed and published by Taito. In North America, it was distributed by Midway Games as Space Invaders Deluxe. It is the sequel to Space Invaders (1978). The player controls a laser base that must destroy formations of descending aliens, while avoiding their projectiles. New features have been added, such as aliens that split into two when shot, an increased high score limit with the player able to save their name as initials, and short cutscenes in-between stages. It runs on the Taito 8080 arcade system.

Gameplay

Space Invaders Part II is a fixed shooter with mechanics similar to its predecessor. The player controls a laser base that must eliminate all of the aliens that march down from the top of the screen, who plot to take over Earth. Aliens slowly move towards the edge of the screen and then move downward, increasing in speed as more aliens are killed. The player can protect their laser base from incoming projectiles by hiding underneath large shields, which become damaged when inflicted by projectiles fired by either the player or aliens. A UFO will occasionally appear at the top of the screen, which can be shot down for bonus points.

Alongside the core Space Invaders gameplay, Part II introduces several new elements. Some aliens will split into two smaller ones when they are shot. A new type of UFO may sometimes appear that flashes as it moves towards the side of the screen, which can only be shot down when it becomes visible. In later stages, UFOs have the ability to deploy additional aliens when few remain. Completing each stage will also award the player with a short cutscene, showing an alien escaping on an UFO. Stages are indicated by the number displayed on the shields.

Development
Space Invaders Part II was released in Japan by Taito in November 1979, and in North America by Midway Games in January 1980. It was designed by Tomohiro Nishikado, the creator of the original Space Invaders, and was made to clear out inventory of excess Space Invaders arcade boards. The North American release was titled Space Invaders Deluxe, however the title screen still uses the Part II name, likely due to Taito's contract with Midway that only allowed them to make minor modifications to the game.

Reception

Cash Box magazine liked the game's colorful graphics and additional gameplay mechanics, saying that it would "add to the enjoyment of the most avid and skilled players." New Computer Express magazine was lukewarm towards Prize Space Invaders for its high price point, although stated that its prize mechanic made this somewhat forgivable. In a 1998 retrospective review, Allgame found Part II to be "barely a sequel" for it having very little differences from the original game, although liked its challenge and blocky graphics. Allgame also criticized it for becoming boring and tedious after prolonged play. Space Invaders creator Tomohiro Nishikado prefers it over the original, citing its variety in gameplay.

Legacy
While the gameplay was largely identical to the original Space Invaders, it added several new features. The high score limit was increased to 99,990 points, compared to the original's more conservative 9,990 limit, while also allowing the player to save their name as initials next to their high score. It also introduced the use of brief comical intermission scenes between levels, where the last invader who gets shot limps off screen, a precursor to the cutscene breaks that later appeared in Pac-Man (1980).

A Game Boy version of the game was released in 1990, which featured support for the Game Link Cable to enable multiplayer. A harder, redemption version of the game, Prize Space Invaders, was released the same year, awarding money based on how well the player did. Part II is included in the compilations Space Invaders Virtual Collection (1995), Space Invaders Anniversary (2004), Taito Memories Gekan (2005), Taito Legends (2005), Taito Legends Power-Up (2007),  and Space Invaders Pocket (2007). It was ported to mobile phones in 2007 as part of Space Invaders Trilogy, bundled with the original Space Invaders and Return of the Invaders. It is also set to appear in the upcoming Nintendo Switch compilation Space Invaders Invincible Collection.

Notes

References

External links
KLOV page

1979 video games
Arcade video games
Midway video games
Mobile games
Space Invaders
Video game sequels
Video games developed in Japan